Count Imre (Emmerich) Széchényi of Sárvár-Felsővidék (15 February 1825, in Vienna – 11 March 1898, in Budapest), was a Hungarian nobleman and landowner, and Austro-Hungarian diplomat and politician. Grandson of Ferenc Széchényi he was Austrian ambassador in Berlin during the government of Bismarck. He signed for the Austrian emperor Bismarck's Alliance of the Three Emperors 1873, and represented Austria at the Berlin Conference on the Congo 1884.

Private life
In his private life, Széchényi was also a cultivated amateur composer of Lieder and dance music. A collection of Széchényi's songs by Katharina Ruckgaber (soprano), Jochen Kupfer (baritone),  (csakan), and Helmut Deutsch (piano) was released on Audimax in 2017. A collection of his polkas and mazurkas for orchestra, played by the Budapest Symphony Orchestra conducted by Valéria Csányi, was released on Naxos in 2017.

References

1825 births
1898 deaths
Austro-Hungarian diplomats
Imre